DNIC can stand for:

 Dirección Nacional de Inteligencia Criminal
 Data Network Identification Code
 Diffuse noxious inhibitory controls
 In Christianity, Dominus Noster Iesus Christus (and other grammatical variants; "Our Lord Jesus Christ")
 In biochemistry, dinitrosyl iron complex
 Direcção nacional de investigação criminal (Angola)
 DoD Network Information Center

pt:Polícia Nacional (Angola)#Órgãos centrais